Antonela Anić (born 1 June 1985 in Bugojno, SFR Yugoslavia) is a Croatian female professional basketball player.

External links
Profile at fibaeurope.com
Profile at eurobasket.com

1985 births
Living people
People from Bugojno
Croats of Bosnia and Herzegovina
Croatian women's basketball players
Small forwards
Power forwards (basketball)